Sarah Porter (August 16, 1813 – February 18, 1900) was the American educator who founded Miss Porter's School, a private college preparatory school for girls.

Biography
She was born in Farmington, Connecticut, to Rev. Noah Porter (1781 – 1866) and his wife, Mehetable "Meigs" Porter (1786 – 1874). Her older brother, Noah Porter, was President of Yale College from 1871 to 1886.

She was educated at Farmington Academy and at the Young Ladies Institute in New Haven, and, uncharacteristically for women of the time, studied privately with Yale College professors. She taught in Massachusetts, New York and Pennsylvania, and returned to Connecticut in 1843 to found a female counterpart to Simeon Hart's Academy for Boys. Initially, she had only 25 students, but because of the school's expansive curriculum, including the sciences as well as the humanities, the daughters of the affluent soon made it their school of choice, and the school quickly expanded. She was an opponent of women's suffrage but promoted other legal reforms for women.

References

External links

Sarah Porter in The Connecticut Women's Hall of Fame

1813 births
1900 deaths
American educators
People from Farmington, Connecticut
Biography articles needing expert attention